Hans Eisele (7 August 1940 – 20 October 2002) was a German football player. He spent eight seasons in the Bundesliga with VfB Stuttgart. The best result he achieved in the league was fifth place.

References

Honours
 DFB-Pokal winner: 1957–58

External links
 

1940 births
2002 deaths
German footballers
VfB Stuttgart players
Bundesliga players
Association football defenders
Footballers from Stuttgart